Oziel França da Silva (born 10 August 1984), known as just Oziel, is a Brazilian footballer who plays for Duque de Caxias.

Career
Oziel scored a goal against Fortaleza in 2010 Copa do Brasil, for Tigres do Brasil. In the previous year he was loaned to city-rival Duque de Caxias, which compete in 2009 Campeonato Brasileiro Série B. In mid-2010 he was signed by Ceará. He played 25 times in 2010 Campeonato Brasileiro Série A.

In January 2011 he was signed by Goiás. He played in 2011 Campeonato Brasileiro Série B.

In January 2012 Oziel left for Guarani, also from Brazilian national second division.

Honours
 Paysandu
 Campeonato Paraense: 2006

Santa Cruz
Campeonato Brasileiro Série C: 2013

References

External links
 Oziel at ZeroZero
 profile Ceará SC
 ogol

1984 births
Brazilian footballers
Living people
Campeonato Brasileiro Série A players
Campeonato Brasileiro Série B players
Campeonato Brasileiro Série C players
Associação Desportiva Cabofriense players
Bangu Atlético Clube players
Botafogo de Futebol e Regatas players
Paysandu Sport Club players
Ituano FC players
Macaé Esporte Futebol Clube players
Esporte Clube Tigres do Brasil players
Duque de Caxias Futebol Clube players
Ceará Sporting Club players
Goiás Esporte Clube players
Guarani FC players
Clube Náutico Capibaribe players
Santa Cruz Futebol Clube players
Association football fullbacks
Sportspeople from Paraíba